Cole Bradley Hults (born May 22, 1998) is an American professional ice hockey defenseman currently with HC Bolzano in the ICE Hockey League (ICEHL). Hults was selected by the Los Angeles Kings in the fifth round, 134th overall, of the 2017 NHL Entry Draft.

Playing career
He played college hockey at Pennsylvania State University and was named to the Second All-AHCA Team after his junior season. Hults was selected 134th overall by the Los Angeles Kings in the 2017 NHL Entry Draft. On April 11, 2020, Hults signed a two-year, entry-level contract with the Kings, forgoing his senior season at Penn State.

In his first professional season, Hults was assigned by the Kings to AHL affiliate, the Ontario Reign, for the shortened 2020–21 season. He made 19 appearances on the blueline for the Reign, collecting 1 goal and 5 points.

On July 24, 2021, Hults was traded by the Kings, along with Bokondji Imama, to the Arizona Coyotes in exchange for Brayden Burke and Tyler Steenbergen.

Hults played one season within the Coyotes organization before leaving as a free agent to sign a one-year contract with Italian club, HC Bolzano of the ICEHL, on August 3, 2022. In signing with Bolzano, Hults joined his brother Mitch at the club.

Career statistics

Awards and honors

References

External links
 

1998 births
Living people
AHCA Division I men's ice hockey All-Americans
American men's ice hockey defensemen
Bolzano HC players
Ice hockey players from Wisconsin
Los Angeles Kings draft picks
Madison Capitols players
Ontario Reign (AHL) players
Penn State Nittany Lions men's ice hockey players
People from Stoughton, Wisconsin
Sportspeople from Madison, Wisconsin
Tucson Roadrunners players